Rugia (island) ( is a German island off the Pomeranian coast in the Baltic Sea, variously called Rugia, Ruegen, Rugen, Rügen in English.

Rugia may also refer to:

 Rugia (district), a former district including Rugia island
 Rugia (duchy) (later Principality), a duchy and then principality located around the island
 Rugia Bridge or Strelasund Crossing, a bridge from the mainland to Rugia island
 Rugia (Pokémon), a type of Pokemon

See also

 
 Rugiland
 Rugii
 Rugi (disambiguation)
 Ruga (disambiguation)